Alias may refer to:

 Pseudonym, a fictitious name that a person or group assumes for a particular purpose
 Pen name, a pseudonym adopted by an author and printed on the title page or by-line of their works in place of their real name
 Stage name, a pseudonym used by performers and entertainers
 Nickname, a substitute for the proper name of a familiar person, place or thing
 Code name, a code word or name used, sometimes clandestinely, to refer to another name, word, project, or person

Arts and entertainment

Film and television
 Alias (2013 film), a 2013 Canadian documentary film
 Alias (TV series), an American action thriller series 2001–2006
 Alias the Jester, a 1995 British animated series 
 Alias – the Bad Man, a 1931 American Western film

Gaming
 Alias (board game)
 Alias (Forgotten Realms), a fictional character in Dungeons & Dragons
 Alias (video game), 2004, based on the TV series

Literature
 Alias (comics), an American comic book series
 Alias Enterprises, an American publishing company

Music
 Alias (band), a Canadian rock supergroup
 Alias (album), 1990
 Alias (The Magic Numbers album), 2014
 Alias (EP), by Shygirl, 2020
 Alias (musician) (Brendon Whitney, 1976–2018), an American rapper
 Alias (Ryan Tedder, born 1979), American singer, songwriter and record producer
 Alias Records, a record label
 "Alias", a song by In Flames from the 2008 album A Sense of Purpose
 "Alias", a song by Scar Tissue from the 2008 album Form/Alkaline

Computing
 alias (command), a shell command
 Alias (Mac OS), a small file representing another object
 Alias (SQL), a feature of SQL
 Aliasing (computing), where a data location can be accessed through different symbolic names
 Alias Systems Corporation, a former software company
 PowerAnimator, also known as Alias
 Autodesk Alias, a family of computer-aided industrial design software 
 Email alias, a forwarding email address
 URL shortening, where a (short) URL redirects to a longer URL

People
 Alias Ali (1939–2014), Malaysian politician
 Florina Alías (1921-1999), Spanish writer
 Alias Avidzba (fl. from 2015), Abkhazian politician

Other uses
 Alias, Iran, or Qahremanabad, a village
 Aliasing, an effect in signal processing

See also

 Allias, a neighbourhood of Tirana, Albania
 Alias method, a family of algorithms for sampling from a discrete probability distribution
 Alias transformation, in analytic geometry